Tamaz Vashakidze (April 14, 1961, in Tbilisi) is an artist (People's Artist of Georgia), premier dancer of the State Georgian Ballet, choreographer, holder of the Order of Honor of Georgia (2001), founder and awardee of the Chabukiani-Balanchine International Festival of Ballet Art, founder of the New Georgian Ballet Theatre of Modern Dance, holder of Special Award of Balanchine's Family, and founder of the Foundation "Chabukiani-Balanchine".

Biography 

Tamaz Vashakidze was born in 1961 in Tbilisi, Georgia. In 1972, he entered Tbilisi Ballet Art State School. His teachers were Vivi Metreveli and Vakhtang Chabukiani. Having graduated from the School in 1979, he was employed as the leading soloist of the company Tbilisi Z. Paliashvili State Academic Theatre of Opera and Ballet. Since 1989, he has been the leading soloist of the Moscow State Theatre Russian Ballet.

In 1991 Vashakidze was awarded the title of People's Artist of Georgia.

From 1991 to 1993, Vashakidze was elected artistic director of the ballet company of the Tbilisi State Academic Opera and Ballet Theatre named after Paliashvili.

In 1993, he was appointed artistic director of the Tbilisi Choreographic School named after Chabukiani.

In 1993, Vashakidze founded a theatre of modern dance, New Georgian Ballet. The first number which was produced in newborn theatre was a number titled "We Begin"; a medley from products of Bach, Beethoven, Mozart, Chopin, Wagner, Rimsky-Korsakov, and Liszt, with the sound of kremlin chimes at the beginning. The performers included Vashakidze, artist on light Vladislav Vlasov and artist on suit Eka Turmanidze. The first night took place in 1993 in Tbilisi academic theatre of the opera and ballet. The first show outside Georgia in the same year in St. Petersburg state conservatory.

The theatre debut took place in 1994 with the first night of the Class-Concert performance at the International Ballet Festival in Aspendos, Turkey.

In 1995, he graduated from the St. Petersburg State Conservatoire in choreography.
In 1999 Vashakidze produced the first Georgian performance in the manner of modern dance, Anbani. Later the same year, the ballet Anbani was presented at the International Modern Dance Festival in the French city of Montpellier. The French press tagged it as the "start of a new day".

"I used to visit Georgia and only can say that Tamaz Vashakidze managed to wonderfully translate Georgian spirit in his creation. I'm happy I could see the performance". (Dieter Tanike, Director General of the Theatre Festival in Hamburg and Ganov)

"Tamaz Vashakidze has charmed with extraordinary energy and breath-taking beauty of movements". (Nathalie Vim, Deputy Director General of the Avignon Festival)

"I believe that the most difficult is to make the spectators of the Montpellier Festival to remember you. Georgians managed to do that. I'm very glad for them. This means that AFFA had made the right decision having supported this project". (Claire Verlet, Chief Manager of dance and theatre programs at AFFA)

In 2001, Vashakidze, in the function of the Director of the Tbilisi Ballet Art State School, had initiated the Chabuakiani-Balanchine International Ballet Art Festival. The first festival was dedicated to the 85th anniversary of the Tbilisi Ballet Art State School.
The same year by Decree of the Georgian President Eduard Shevardnadze No. 892 from September 3, 2001, Tamaz Vashakidze was awarded with the Order of Honor for development and popularization of the Georgian ballet art and running the First International Ballet Art Festival Chabukiani-Balanchine.

"The Tbilisi Ballet Art State School named after genius creative personality Vakhtang Chabukiani is celebrating its eighty-fifth jubilee. It is remarkable, that the First Chabukiani-Balanchine International Ballet Art Festival is dedicated to this event. If we may speak today about Georgian contribution in the treasury of the world ballet, then first of all it is the merit of the Vakhtang Chabukiani Tbilisi Ballet Art State School. I'm sure that the First Chabukiani-Balanchine International Ballet Art Festival will write interesting pages in the history of world arts." (Sesili Gogiberidze, Georgian Minister of Culture. Speech at the Festival opening ceremony)

"I am happy to congratulate the remarkable team of the Vakhtang Chabukiani Tbilisi Ballet Art State School with its 85th anniversary. The name of the great dancer that your School has is much obliging. And it's joyful to realize that due to everyday efforts of the teachers the glory of Georgian choreography art does not fade away still nowadays. Your students shine not only on Georgian stage, but on many famed stages of the world, including the stages of the Bolshoi Theatre of Russia and Mariinsky Theatre. I wish you much success in this noble field. Today is your holiday. I am sure that the First Chabukiani-Balanchine International Ballet Art Festival held in Tbilisi and dedicated to this memorable anniversary will bring you real joy of meeting with fine art." (M. Shvydkoy, Minister of Culture of the Russian Federation. Speech at the Festival opening ceremony)

In 2002, Vashakidze started the Foundation Chabukiani-Balanchine.

From 1993 to 2004 he was appointed artistic director of the Tbilisi Ballet Art State School by the Georgian Minister of Culture Dato Magradze. In 2001 Vashakidze was appointed director of the Tbilisi Ballet Art State School.

In 2005, by invitation of the Federal Agency for Culture and Cinematography of Russia, Vashakidze produced the ballet Big Waltz to music by Johann Strauss on the stage of the Concert Hall named after Tchaikovsky (Moscow), having become the first Georgian choreographer whose ballet first night took place on stage starring dancers from the Russian Ballet company.
Following the first night of the production of Big Waltz in Moscow (1.5 years after Tamaz Vashakidze was fired from the Tbilisi Ballet Art School) he received an invitation to the General Prosecutor's Office in Georgia for testifying. 

In September 2005, his name was put on the wanted list, although the Georgian authorities knew where he was. By the invitation of the Agency for Culture and Cinematography Vashakidze was in Ekaterinburg, where he negotiated the production of the Big Waltz ballet on the stage of the local Opera and Ballet Theatre (the production took place in 2006).

In 2006, Tamaz Vashakidze became the ballet master of the Ekaterinburg State Academic Opera and Ballet Theatre.

In 2007, after being arrested on Russian territory under the requisition of Georgian authorities, Tamaz Vashakidze asked the Russian Government for political asylum. In 2008 Russia granted his application and Vashakidze was given the status of political refugee. In 2008 the Ekaterinburg State Academic Opera and Ballet Theatre made Vashakidze a member of artistic management of the theatre as its ballet master.

In 2010, by invitation of the Russian State Circus Company Rosgostsirk, Vashakidze accepted the function of director-producer of Rosgostsirk.

On 27 May 2010, Tamaz Vashakidze became a member of the Theatre Union of Russian Federation.

Parts In Ballet Performances 
 Appassionata (Choreography: V. Chabukiani) — Youth
 Don Quixote	(Choreography: V. Chabukiani) — Basil
 Don Quixote	(Choreography: V. Chabukiani) — Torero
 The Sleeping Beauty	(Choreography: V. Chabukiani) — Desiree
 Gorda (Choreography: V. Chabukiani) — Mamia
 The Vision Of Rose (Choreography: V. Chabukiani) — Youth
 Serenade (Choreography: G. Balanchine) — Youth
 Theme With Variations (Choreography: G. Balanchine) — Soloist
 Romeo And Juliet (Choreography: L. Lavrovsky) — Romeo
 Romeo And Juliet (Choreography: L. Lavrovsky) — Tybalt
 Porgy And Bess (Choreography: M. Lavrovsky) — Crown
 Pirosmani (Choreography: G. Alexidze) — Pirosmani
 Prodigal Son (Choreography: G. Alexidze) — Prodigal Son
 From Columbus To Broadway (Choreography: G. Alexidze) — Columbus
 Amazons (Choreography: G. Alexidze) — Chief
 Romeo And Juliet (Choreography: G. Alexidze) — Romeo
 Medea (Choreography: G. Alexidze) — Masque
 Seasons (Choreography: G. Alexidze) — Soloist
 One-Act Ballets (Choreography: G. Alexidze) — Soloist
 Francesco Da Rimini (Choreography: G. Alexidze) — Soloist
 One-Act Ballet (Choreography: G. Alexidze) — Centaur
 Mata Hari (Choreography: T. Vashakidze) — Officer
 Class-Concert (Choreography: T. Vashakidze) — Teacher

"Athletic figure of T. Vashakidze matched well to translate the inhuman trick of the brigand Crown. Unfortunately, artists of this kind are impossible to find on our stage." Ansa Hartelin. "In ballet shoes, in slum" (newspaper Aamulehti, April 21, 1985, Finland)
"The black prototype — Crown — is a massive success of the young dancer T. Vashakidze. The improviser's negative charm and temperament fascinate, his bright dance delights and takes one's breath away." V. Uralskaya. Poetry of feelings (Moscow)
"Tamaz Vashakidze (Chief) has such an actor's charm, such a catching temperament that he is able to excite hearts of the most phlegmatic spectators..." Neli Bregadze, art critic. And the faith in Good (Tbilisi)
"Tybalt by Tamaz Vashakidze was so unconventional; he broke so much the traditional perception of this Shakespeare's character, that the part provoked a lot of discussions and positioned the dancer as a bright actor." Excerpt from the article Tamaz Vashakidze (Newspaper Sovetskaya Kultura, Moscow)

Productions 

From 1993 to 2008 Tamaz Vashakidze produced 14 ballet performances as director and choreographer of the non-repertory theatre of modern dance New Georgian Ballet. Three of them (marked in the list with a *) were produced as part of side projects:

 1993. One-act performance Loneliness to music by Gustav Mahler
 1993. Performance Class-Concert to music by Pyotr Tchaikovsky, Gustav Mahler, Ludwig Minkus and others
 1994. Variations to music by Alfred Schnittke
 1995. Bolero to music by Maurice Ravel
 1996. Improvisations to music by Ray Charles
 1999. Suite Iavnana to music by Pyotr Tchaikovsky
 1999. Anbani * to music by Gogi Dzodzuashvili
 2000. The Morning Chant * to music by Gogi Dzodzuashvili
 2002. Prodigal Son to music by Bidzina Kvernadze (co-directed by Kote Makharadze)
 2004. Mata Hari to music by Sergei Prokofiev and Gogi Dzodzuashvili and songs by Edith Piaf
 2004. The Big Waltz to music by Johann Strauss
 2006. Polyphony to music by Gogi Dzodzuashvili
 2007. The Knight — an interpretation of Shota Rustaveli's poem The Knight in Tiger Skin
 2008. Shalom. The Return of the Prodigal Son * to music by Gustav Mahler and George Gershwin as well as national Georgian chants and songs by Frank Sinatra

Academic Staging 

Tamaz Vashakidze made over thirty productions in the leading academic theatres of Georgia in theatres named after Rustaveli, Marjanishvili, Griboyedov and others.

 In 1996 he was choreography director of the first international TV festival in Georgia Mana 96.
 In 2001 he produced the ballet The Nutcracker to music by Tchaikovsky for the ballet company Ballet RATI.
 In 2007, the performance Polyphony whose ballet master and producer was Tamaz Vashakidze and was awarded with theatre award named after Yivan Kyrla in nomination Grand Prix.
 In 2009 Vashakidze was choreographer and producer of the performance Khanuma in Sverdlovsk Academic Drama House (directed by Alexander Issakov and designed by Nino Kitia).

Cinema and TV 
Tamaz Vashakidze has acted as main characters in the following films:
 Odeon

Prize-winner of the Cannes TV Film Festival

Screenplay and direction: Alexander Vakhtangov (member of the Board of Directors of the International EMMY Award, winner of the State Prize of Georgia)

Composer: Alfred Schnittke

Country: Georgia, Russia (Lentelefilm, Georgian TV Film), 1993

Main character(s) acted by: Tamaz Vashakidze, Nato Murvanidze, Gogi Osepaishvili

 Ballet Master

Screenplay and direction: Alexander Vakhtangov

Composer: Davit Evgenidze

Main character(s) acted by: Maka Makharadze, Tamaz Vashakidze, Irma Nioradze

 Night Dreams

Finalist of the EMMN TV Films Festival in New York, 1999

Screenplay and direction: Alexander Vakhtangov

Compose: Dmitri Shostakovich

Main character(s) acted by: Tamaz Vashakidze

Also, Tamaz Vashakidze acted in films:
 "Ashik-Kerib" directed by Serge Parajanov
 "Rivares" directed by Bidzin Chkheidze
 "Improvisation" by Nino Lapiashvili

External links 
  

Male dancers from Tbilisi
Male ballet dancers from Georgia (country)
Ballet teachers
Ballet masters
Ballet choreographers
1961 births
Living people
Recipients of the Order of Honor (Georgia)